Eulenberg is a municipality in Rhineland-Palatinate, Germany

Eulenberg or Eulenburg may also refer to:

People 
 Eulenburg (surname)
 Philipp, Prince of Eulenburg and Hertefeld (1847–1921)

Other uses 
 Ernst Eulenburg (musical editions), music publisher established by Ernst Eulenburg
 Eulenburg Expedition, a diplomatic mission conducted by Friedrich Albrecht zu Eulenburg to establish diplomatic and commercial relations with China, Japan and Siam
 Eulenburg Affair, or Harden–Eulenburg Affair, a controversy regarding accusations of homosexual conduct, and accompanying libel trials, among prominent members of Kaiser Wilhelm II's cabinet and entourage
 Sovinec, a castle in Bruntál District of the Czech Republic

See also 
 Eilenburg, a town in Saxony, Germany